PWV may refer to:
Parama Weera Vibhushanaya, a military decoration Sri Lanka
Pretoria-Witwatersrand-Vereeniging, now Gauteng, a province of South Africa. Also the name of Gauteng province for a short time, and the name of a region in the defunct Transvaal province that became Gauteng
PWV Megalopolis or Gauteng City Region, a megalopolitan structure at the core of Gauteng province
 Pittsburgh and West Virginia Railway, a former railroad running from West Virginia to Pittsburgh
 Pulse wave velocity